The Estadio Tomás A. Ducó is a stadium in Argentina, located in the Parque Patricios neighborhood of Buenos Aires. The stadium is the home ground of Club Atlético Huracán and has a capacity of 48,314.

Inaugurated in 1924 and totally refurbished in 1947, the stadium was named after lieutenant colonel Tomás Adolfo Ducó, president of Club huracán in three periods (1938–45, 1949, 1952–54) and regarded as the most notable chairman in the history of the institution, apart of being the promoter of the stadium's reconstruction in the 1940s.

History

Jorge Newbery 

The first field of C.A. Huracán was a land on Arenas street that belonged to the Municipality of Buenos Aires. The club rented that land from 1911 to 1913, when the Municipal authorities forced the club to leave the land and to establish in another place. In 1914 Huracán moved to Chiclana avenue, near to San Lorenzo de Almagro venue on La Plata Avenue. Playing its home games there, Huracán won its first Primera División titles in 1921 and 1922. One year later, Huracán left that field.

In August 1924, the club rented a land on the corner of Amancio Alcorta and Luna in Parque Patricios. The venue, inaugurated in a match v Colón de Santa Fe, had a capacity for 12,000 people and was named after Argentine aviator Jorge Newbery, from whose balloon the club had taken inspiration for its badge. Newbery would also a usual collaborator of the club and even honorary president. Huracán played its home games there when the club won the 1925 and 1928 league titles. By the mid-1930s, the stadium had increased its capacity to near 40,000.

The stadium had also a concrete-made race track for motorcycle racing, also used for track cycling. Competitions were held during the 1920s and 1930s.

In April 1939 the club acquired the land –at a cost of $ 700,000– to remodel the stadium. The National Government granted C.A. Huracán a loan to build its new home venue.

Tomás Adolfo Ducó 

Works started in October 1941, under the direction of architects Curutchet, Giraldez & Olivera through their firm "CGO". The studio had designed the current Casa de la Moneda building in 1941. Works on Huracán's stadium lasted about six years, during which the club was granted another loan ($1,553,472) to finish the construction.

The remodeled stadium (works included the replacement of wooden grandstands by structures of concrete) was re-opened on September 7, 1947, in a Primera División match v Boca Juniors. Huracán won 4–3. Nevertheless, it was officially inaugurated on November 10, 1949, when Huracán beat Uruguayan side Peñarol 4–1.

In September 1967 the stadium was named "Tomás Adolfo Ducó", honoring the club's most notable president, who was also the main mover in the construction of the stadium, and a former player.

Ducó was imprisoned and confined to Martín García Island. After being released, he returned to Huracán, being elected again as president of the club in 1949.

Other events
The stadium has been hosted several music concerts, mainly of local rock bands. Patricio Rey y sus Redonditos de Ricota gave their first concert in a stadium at Huracán in 1993, with more than 80,000 spectators.

Hard rock band La Renga performed in Huracán in 1999 with an attendance of 60,000. The band returned to the Ducó to record their live album Insoportablemente Vivo in 2001. They also recorded another live album, En el Ojo del Huracán five years later. The Palacio Ducó became a frequent venue for the band, giving new concerts in 2017. Another Argentine rock band, Los Piojos, recorded a live album at Huracán in 2001.

In popular culture
The Tomás A. Ducó stadium was the first of Argentine football to appear on an Academy Awards-winning movie, The Secret in Their Eyes ("El Secreto de Sus Ojos"). In the movie, Inspector Espósito (played by Ricardo Darín and his collaborator Sandoval (Guillermo Francella) attend a Huracán v Racing match –held in Palacio Ducó– in search of a murder suspect, knowing he was a strong Racing supporter.

The phrase about the suspect's passion for a team ("The guy may change anything; his face, house, family, girlfriend, religion, God. But there is a thing that he can't change: his passion") became one of the most memorable moments of the film, not only to describe the character but the Argentine passion for football.

Gallery

References

External links

 
 Estadio Tomás Adolfo Ducó photos at World Stadiums 

H
S
H
H